In number theory, natural density (also referred to as asymptotic density or arithmetic density) is one method to measure how "large" a subset of the set of natural numbers is. It relies chiefly on the probability of encountering members of the desired subset when combing through the interval  as  grows large.

Intuitively, it is thought that there are more positive integers than perfect squares, since every perfect square is already positive, and many other positive integers exist besides. However, the set of positive integers is not in fact larger than the set of perfect squares: both sets are infinite and countable and can therefore be put in one-to-one correspondence. Nevertheless if one goes through the natural numbers, the squares become increasingly scarce. The notion of natural density makes this intuition precise for many, but not all, subsets of the naturals (see Schnirelmann density, which is similar to natural density but defined for all subsets of ).

This notion can be understood as a kind of probability of choosing a number from the set . Indeed, the asymptotic density (as well as some other types of densities) is studied in probabilistic number theory.

Definition

It follows from the definition that if a set  has natural density  then .

Upper and lower asymptotic density

where lim sup is the limit superior.

where lim inf is the limit inferior. One may say  has asymptotic density  if , in which case  is equal to this common value.

This definition can be restated in the following way:

if this limit exists.

These definitions may equivalently be expressed in the following way.

Then

and

if the limit exists.

A somewhat weaker notion of density is the upper Banach density  of a set   This is defined as

Properties and examples

 For any finite set F of positive integers, d(F) = 0.

 Corollary: If  is finite (including the case ),  

 If  and  exist, then 

 If  is the set of all squares, then d(A) = 0.

 If  is the set of all even numbers, then d(A) = 0.5. Similarly, for any arithmetical progression  we get 

 For the set P of all primes we get from the prime number theorem that d(P) = 0.

 The set of all square-free integers has density  More generally, the set of all nth-power-free numbers for any natural n has density  where  is the Riemann zeta function.

 The set of abundant numbers has non-zero density.  Marc Deléglise showed in 1998 that the density of the set of abundant numbers is between 0.2474 and 0.2480.

 The set 
 
of numbers whose binary expansion contains an odd number of digits is an example of a set which does not have an asymptotic density, since the upper density of this set is

whereas its lower density is

 The set of numbers whose decimal expansion begins with the digit 1 similarly has no natural density: the lower density is 1/9 and the upper density is 5/9. (See Benford's law.)

Then, by definition,  for all .

 If S is a set of positive upper density then Szemerédi's theorem states that S contains arbitrarily large finite arithmetic progressions, and the Furstenberg–Sárközy theorem states that some two members of S differ by a square number.

Other density functions
Other density functions on subsets of the natural numbers may be defined analogously.  For example, the logarithmic density of a set A is defined as the limit (if it exists)

Upper and lower logarithmic densities are defined analogously as well.

For the set of multiples of an integer sequence, the Davenport–Erdős theorem states that the natural density, when it exists, is equal to the logarithmic density.

See also 
Dirichlet density
Erdős conjecture on arithmetic progressions

Notes

References
 
 
 
 

Number theory
Combinatorics